The 1962 Maine gubernatorial election took place on November 6, 1962. Incumbent Republican Governor John Reed, had been elected in 1960 in a special election to finish the final two years of Clinton Clauson's term following his death, and was seeking a full term of his own.  He faced off against Democratic challenger Maynard C. Dolloff.  Reed was re-elected by one of the narrowest margins in Maine history – a mere 483 votes.

, this was the last Maine gubernatorial election in which the Republican candidate won over 50% of the vote.

Results

Notes

1962
Maine
Gubernatorial
November 1962 events in the United States